The 1931 Kansas State Wildcats football team was an American football team that represented Kansas State University during the 1931 college football season as a member of the Big Six Conference. In their fourth year under head coach Bo McMillin, the Wildcats compiled an overall record of 8–2, with a mark of 3–2 in conference play.

Schedule

References

Kansas State
Kansas State Wildcats football seasons
Kansas State Wildcats football